The Fox River is a river in northern Manitoba, Canada. It flows east-northeast parallel to and between the Nelson River to the north and the Hayes River to the south. At the head of the Bigstone is Utik or Deer Lake from which it is possible to cross to Cross Lake on the Nelson. This route was part of the "Middle Tract" used by smaller Indian canoes to bring furs to the Hudson's Bay Company posts of Hudson Bay.

See also
List of rivers of Manitoba

References
 Eric C. Morse, Fur Trade Canoe Routes of Canada/Then and Now, 1979

Rivers of Manitoba
Tributaries of Hudson Bay